The 2008 Australian Production Car Championship was a CAMS sanctioned Australian motor racing title for drivers of Group 3E Series Production Cars. The title was awarded in conjunction with the 2008 Australian Manufacturers' Championship and was the 15th Australian Production Car Championship.

The championship was won by Colin Osborne, driving a Toyota Celica.

Schedule
The championship was contested over a four-round series with all rounds run concurrently with those of the 2008 Australian Manufacturers' Championship.

Classes

Cars competed in six classes:
 Class A: High Performance Vehicles All Wheel Drive (under $125k)
 Class B: High Performance Vehicles Rear Wheel Drive (under $125k)
 Class C: Hot Hatches and Sedans
 Class D: Production Sports
 Class E: Four Cylinder Sedans and Hatches
 Class F: Eco Diesel/Hybrid (No Class F cars competed in the championship)

Points
Points were awarded to registered drivers for class placings achieved at each race on varying scales depending on the number of competitors in each class at each round.
 Where six or more cars attempted to qualify for a class, championship points were awarded to registered drivers on a 30–25–22–20–18–16–14–12–10–8 basis for the first ten finishers in that class in each race.
 Where four or five cars attempted to qualify for a class, championship points were awarded to registered drivers on a 25–20–16–12–10 basis for the first six finishers in the class in each race.
 Where one, two or three cars attempted to qualify for a class, championship points were awarded to registered drivers on a 20–14–10 basis for the first three finishers in the class in each race.
No points were awarded for outright race placings.

For Rounds 1 & 4, co-drivers, where nominated, were eligible to score points so long as they were registered for the Championship.

Results

See also 
 2008 Australian Manufacturers' Championship, which was contested concurrently with the 2008 Australian Production Car Championship.

References

Further reading
 Grant Rowley, Factory Fighter, The Annual – Number 4/2008, pages 116–117

External links
 Race Results Archive – 2008, racing.natsoft.com.au > Circuit Racing > Year = 2008 etc
 Images from the 2008 CAMS Nationals meetings including Australian Manufacturers Championship / Australian Production Car Championship rounds
 2008 Australian Manufacturers Championship Sporting Regulations, Version 2, www.camsmanual.com.au, as archived at web.archive.org
 2008 Group 3E Series Production Car Technical Regulations, www.camsmanual.com.au, as archived at web.archive.org

Australian Production Car Championship
Production Car Championship